At the time of the discovery of Brazil by the Europeans, a total of 2,000 indigenous nations, divided into several thousand tribes, existed in Brazil. The total number of native tribes which inhabited present day Brazil at the time of first contact is disputed and difficult to ascertain. The names of large number of tribes who were exterminated as a result of intertribal warfare are not recorded anywhere and so is the case of several smaller tribes who were wiped out by the colonizers. Curt Nimuendajú gives a list of 1,400 nations in his monumental work Mapa etno-histórico do Brasil e regiões adjacentes, but he ignored many smaller (extinct) tribes in Eastern Brazil, and was at the time of writing unaware of some other tribes which were uncontacted at that time. Currently only 200 nations (790 tribes) are alive, with no survivors being reported for the remaining nations. However, this doesn't mean their bloodlines are extinct; only their cultures. Brazilian Pardo and Mestizo population have mostly unknown indigenous backgrounds, some or several of them likely stemming from extinct cultures. The Bandeirantes hunted and enslaved indigenous peoples in the then unexplored interior of Brazil from the 16th to the early 19th century. The indigenous peoples were eventually acculturated and integrated into European civilization.

Most of the recorded extinctions of the Brazilian tribes were caused by warfare with the neo-Brazilians and from the epidemics which were sometimes deliberately spread by the colonizers. Intertribal warfare between various native Brazilian tribes also caused a significant number of extinctions. For example, the Matses, one of the tribes in the Vale do Javari region exterminated at least 4 smaller tribes during the 20th century.

Famous extinct Brazilian nations

Out of the more than 1,800 extinct nations and thousands of tribes, names are available for only a few of them.

 Abacaxis - Abacaxis River
 Abaeté - Tupian (?). Minas Gerais. Extinct since the 18th century
 Abaeté do Rio Madeira - Same as Abacátes (?). Rio Madeira, Amazonas
 Abarés - Northeast Brazil
 Acauas - Also known as Acauans - Lower Amazon
 Achouaris - Rio Jurua and Rio Solimoes
 Acroa - Bahia province - related to Xokleng people
 Addaraias - Rio Negro
 Adorias - Near Amazon River - extinct since the start of the 19th century
 Aipatsé - Previously inhabited the Xingu river region - became extinct during the 1980s
 Akontsu - Still alive but fated to be extinct in a near future. Only survivors are six people. Five are elders. Rondônia.
 Anumania - Previously inhabited the Xingu river region
 Aracadaini - Amazonas
 Araés - Goias
 Araraus - Rio Jatapu, Amazonas
 Ariquéns - Rio Jamari, Rondonia
 Amena-Diapá - Once inhabited the region around São Felipe river, in the Acre - Amazonas border
 Bacuéns - Minas Gerais
 Beaquéos - Mato Grosso do Sul
 Boimés - Sergipe
 Boraris - Para
 Burukäyo - Related to the Arikapú
 Cabixiana - Near Corumbiara, Rondônia. Became extinct during the 1940s.
 Caeté - Once inhabited the region near the mouth of river São Francisco to the island of Itamaracá.
 Camamu - Ceara
 Campe - Related to Makurap. From Rio Mequens, Rondonia. Extinct since early 20th century.
 Canela, Kenkateye - Part of the Canela nation. Originally from Serra das Alpercatas, Maranhao. According to Nimuendajú, this tribe became extinct after the ranchers massacred them in 1913.
 Cauixana - Arawakan. From Rio Mauapari. Extinct since early 20th century.
 Cataguéo - Related to Caduveo
 Coropó - Espirito Santo
 Cracmuns - Minas Gerais
 Crateús - Piaui
 Cucoecamecrãs - Maranhao
 Cujigeneris - Amazonas
 Cupinharós - Once lived in Piaui
 Goitacá - Previously inhabited a large stretch of the eastern Brazilian coast, from the São Mateus River to the Paraíba do Sul River.
 Guatiedéos - Mato Grosso do Sul.
 Guatiedéo - Related to Caduveo
 Gueguê - Piaui
 Guayanases - Are known to have inhabited the Plains of Piratininga which is now the city of São Paulo.
 Irã-Amráire - One of the Kayapo nations. Numbered 3,000 in 1900, divided into five tribes (Kren-re, Nhangagakrin, Kuben Ken Kam, Me Mranh & Mejôt´yr). Became extinct in the 20th century.
 Jeikó - Extinct since the 19th century.
 Juma - lived in the Terra Indígena Juma in the Amazonas, along the Mucuim River, a tributary of Rio Açuã. The tribe is extinct since 2021.
 Kinikinao - Matro Grosso do Sul. Extinct in mid-20th century.
 Kutenabu (Kustenau) - Previously inhabited the Xingu river region. Became extinct in 20th century The last two survivors, a woman and her son, were assimilated into the Waura.
 Maxubí - Related to the Arikapú.
 Manitsawa - Previously inhabited the Xingu river region
 Mbaya - Guaycuruan speakers and nomads of the Gran Chaco, who migrated to Mato Grosso do Sul in the late 18th century.  Survived by the Kadiweu.
 Naravute - Previously inhabited the Xingu river region. Became extinct during the 1940s.
 Purí - Previously resided in coastal Brazil.
 Tapajós - Amazonas
 Tupinambá - Once inhabited the Atlantic coast of Brazil.
 Urucu - Related to Botocudo, Minas Gerais.
 Western Bororo - Extinct since the end of 19th century.

Recent Extinctions

According to Darcy Ribeiro, a total of 87 tribes became extinct during the 1900-57 period. Another 38 became Assimilated (detribalized and merged in to the general population).

Recorded extinctions of Brazilian tribes during the 1900–1957 time period:

*Ribeiro grouped several nations into one in certain cases. For example, the Arara are actually 4 different tribes, which may or may not be linguistically and ethnically related. In such cases, the names of the known individual nations are given in Square Brackets.
In some cases, the tribes which were classified as extinct later re-emerged and exerted their identity. Examples are Krenak and Apiacá
In certain other cases, tribes which became extinct in Brasil existed as a living nation elsewhere, such as the Oyanpik

References

Indigenous peoples in Brazil
Extinct ethnic groups